Lashkarabad (also Romanized as Lashkarābād and Lashgarābād) is a village in Ramjin Rural District of Ramjin District, Chaharbagh County, Alborz province, Iran. At the 2006 census, its population was 4,651 in 1,194 households, at which time it was in Savojbolagh County, Tehran province. At the time of the latest census in 2016, the population had risen to 7,198 in 2,281 households; it was the largest village in its rural district.

References 

Populated places in Alborz Province